Joseph Talton Strong (born August 4, 1902 and died November 12, 1986) was a Negro leagues pitcher, playing for several teams. Most of his seasons, he played for the Baltimore Black Sox, and the Homestead Grays.

Strong attended college at Wilberforce University in Wilberforce, Ohio.

He died in Middletown, Ohio when he was 84.

References

External links
 and Baseball-Reference Black Baseball and Mexican League stats and Seamheads

Negro league baseball managers
Baltimore Black Sox players
Cleveland Tate Stars players
Chicago American Giants players
St. Louis Stars (baseball) players
Milwaukee Bears players
Pittsburgh Crawfords players
Hilldale Club players
Homestead Grays players
People from Jackson, Kentucky
1902 births
1986 deaths
20th-century African-American sportspeople